Fferam is an area in the  community of Tref Alaw, Ynys Môn, Wales, which is 138.2 miles (222.4 km) from Cardiff and 221.8 miles (356.9 km) from London.

References

See also
List of localities in Wales by population

Villages in Anglesey